Sticta venosa is a species of lichen in the family Peltigeraceae. It is known only from Pichincha Province, Ecuador, where it grows on the ground between mosses in a montane rainforest in the Río Guajalito Protected Forest.  It was described as new to science in 2011.

References

venosa
Lichen species
Lichens described in 2011
Lichens of Ecuador
Taxa named by Robert Lücking